Incilius campbelli (commonly known as Campbell's rainforest toad or Campbell's forest toad) is a species of toad in the family Bufonidae. It was first described in 1994.
It is found in eastern Chiapas (Mexico), Guatemala, western Honduras, and Maya Mountains, Belize.
Its natural habitats are lowland moist and premontane wet forests, and pristine forests in mountainous regions. It is threatened by habitat loss.

References

campbelli
Amphibians of Belize
Amphibians of Guatemala
Amphibians of Honduras
Amphibians of Mexico
Amphibians described in 1994
Taxonomy articles created by Polbot